Peter Noyes is a Welsh academic who was the Vice-Chancellor of University of Wales, Newport in Newport, South Wales, UK, 2006-2012.

Noyes has a degree in social psychology from Loughborough University and a Ph.D. in educational psychology from the University of London. Noyes joined the University of Wales administrative staff in 1996, after previously working at the Cheltenham & Gloucester College of Higher Education; he was appointed as vice-chancellor in 2006. On 8 May 2012 he issued a statement that he would be stepping down from his post at the end of the academic year for "personal reasons".

References

Academics of the University of Wales, Newport
Alumni of Loughborough University
Living people
Date of birth missing (living people)
Year of birth missing (living people)